German submarine U-921 was a Type VIIC U-boat of Nazi Germany's Kriegsmarine during World War II.

She was ordered on 6 June 1941, and was laid down on 15 October 1941 at Neptun Werft AG, Rostock, as yard number 508. She was launched on 3 April 1943 and commissioned under the command of Oberleutnant zur See Wolfgang Leu on 30 May 1943.

Design
German Type VIIC submarines were preceded by the shorter Type VIIB submarines. U-921 had a displacement of  when at the surface and  while submerged. She had two shafts and two  propellers.

U-921 was fitted with five  torpedo tubes (four fitted at the bow and one at the stern), fourteen torpedoes or 26 TMA mines, one  SK C/35 naval gun, (220 rounds), one  Flak M42 and two twin  C/30 anti-aircraft guns. The boat had a complement of between 44 — 52 men.

Service history
On 24 May 1944, U-921 was spotted off Norway, en route to Narvik, by a Canadian Sunderland, DV990, of 422/R Squadron RCAF piloted by F/O G.E. Holley. U-921 was able to hit the Sunderland on its attack run causing it to crash into the sea after dropping three depth charges, which resulted in no damage to U-921 but all the crewmen of the Sunderland were lost.

Shortly after this first attack U-921 was sighted by another Canadian Sunderland, DW111, of 423/S Squadron RCAF piloted by F/L R.H. Nesbitt. U-921 was able to avoid the five depth charges dropped by the Sunderland but strafing wounded the commander, Oberleutnant zur See Wolfgang Leu, and two other crewmen. As U-921 was diving, Leu was able to get both of the wounded crewmen below, but then closed the hatch to prevent her from sinking, sacrificing himself. U-921 sailed for Trondheim, arriving 26 May 1944, under command of her I. WO (1st Wachoffizier) Leutnant zur See Hans-Joachim Neumann.

U-921 was ordered to continue to operate against Convoy RA 60 and postpone her return. On 2 October 1944 she was listed as missing when, after the end of the convoy battle, she failed to return to Narvik.

Wolfpacks
U-921 took part in one wolfpack, namely:
 Grimm (9 September — 2 October 1944)

References

Bibliography

External links

German Type VIIC submarines
U-boats commissioned in 1943
World War II submarines of Germany
Ships built in Rostock
1943 ships
Maritime incidents in September 1944
World War II shipwrecks in the Norwegian Sea
Missing U-boats of World War II